Frank Parks Briggs (February 25, 1894September 23, 1992) was a United States senator from Missouri, and succeeded Harry S. Truman when Truman was elected vice president.

Biography
Frank P. Briggs was born in Armstrong, Missouri on February 25, 1894.  He attended the schools of Armstrong and Fayette, and was a student at Central College from 1911 to 1914. He graduated from the University of Missouri in Columbia in 1915.

Briggs became active in the newspaper and publishing businesses in Macon, Missouri as owner of the Macon Chronicle-Herald. In addition to serving as editor and publisher, Briggs was also the author of a regular column, "It Seems to B".  A Democrat, he was mayor of Macon from 1930 to 1932, and a member of the Missouri Senate from 1933 to 1944.

On January 18, 1945, Briggs was appointed to the U.S. Senate to fill the vacancy caused by the resignation of Harry S. Truman.  He served from January 18, 1945 to January 3, 1947, and was an unsuccessful candidate for election to the full term in 1946.

After leaving the Senate, Briggs resumed work in his newspaper and publishing businesses.  He was a longtime member of the Missouri State Conservation Commission, and served four terms as its chairman.  From 1961 to 1965 he was United States Assistant Secretary of the Interior for Fish and Wildlife.

Briggs sold his newspaper in 1973, after which he lived in retirement in Macon.  He died at Samaritan Hospital in Macon on September 23, 1992, and was buried at Walnut Ridge Cemetery in Fayette.

Family
Briggs was married to the former Catherine Shull.  They were the parents of three daughters, Ruth, Betty, Dorothy and two sons Eugene, and Tommy.

References

1894 births
1992 deaths
Mayors of places in Missouri
Democratic Party Missouri state senators
University of Missouri alumni
Politicians from Columbia, Missouri
Democratic Party United States senators from Missouri
20th-century American politicians
Businesspeople from Columbia, Missouri
People from Howard County, Missouri
People from Macon, Missouri
20th-century American businesspeople